Ashwajit Singh (born 7 November 1961) is a first-generation Indian entrepreneur and development practitioner. He is the Founder and Managing Director of IPE Global Group, a social sector consultancy firm in South Asia. Singh has over 30 years of experience in development space and corporate & financial advisory services. He has worked across Africa, Asia & Europe and provided strong leadership and strategic direction to the IPE Global Group since its inception in 1998. He is also the Chairman of Triple Line Consulting (an IPE Global Group company), a UK based international development consulting firm.

Early life and education
Ashwajit was born in New Delhi to Beeba and Kawaljit Singh. His father has been a senior official in the Indian Revenue Service and maternal grandfather Kunwar Mohinder Singh Bedi Sahar was in the Indian Administrative Service also, a well-known Urdu poet. Ashwajit is married to Tanya Singh, a Chartered Accountant. They have two children Eshaan and Piya both educated at University of Warwick.

Ashwajit completed his schooling at Modern School, Barakhamba Road, New Delhi and won the Rudra Prize for best all-rounder student in 1980. He later completed his graduation from Shri Ram College of Commerce, University of Delhi and went on to do his Chartered Accountancy & Company Secretary where he was ranked 1st in India (1986).

He qualified as a Certified Internal Auditor (Florida, USA). He was awarded the prestigious Inlaks scholarship to study post-graduation from the London School of Economics & Political Science, UK before returning to India to become an entrepreneur in 1988.

In the later years, he completed a course on Block Chain Strategy from University of Oxford as well as did a two-year executive OPM Program at Harvard Business School.

Career
In 1989, Singh started his journey as a first-generation entrepreneur by promoting an Investment Banking and Financial services company in India. He later, dis-invested the company in 2001 after forming IPE Global Ltd; an international development consulting group.

Singh has steered the IPE Global company to take up many innovative and high social impact assignments with twin objectives of economic growth and social equity. From a humble beginning, today, the Group has over 1000 staff members. It draws together a team of economists, chartered accountants, sociologists, public sector experts, educationists, urban planners, architects, environmentalists, scientists, project managers and program managers who work across various projects in the company.

Philanthropy 
Singh is involved in the Centre for Urban and Regional Excellence (CURE) a not-for-profit development organization which reconnects urban societies that take informed decisions to ensure sustainable urban development. He is also involved in Ashtan Foundation, a platform that supports girl child education through scholarships.

Board Memberships 
 Chairman, Triple Line Consulting Ltd.
 Chairperson, London School of Economics Alumni Association, Delhi
 Chairman, Kunwar Mohinder Singh Bedi Memorial Trust
 Advisory Board Member, Indian School of Business & Finance (ISBF)
 Director, Ajooni Impact Investment Advisor Private Limited - A Social Impact fund
 Former Chairman, Public Administration and Management- Technical Advisory Panel (PAMNET), Africa Capacity Building Foundation (ACBF)
 Founder Trustee, Centre for Urban and Regional Excellence (CURE)
 President, Modern School Alumni Association (2014-2016)
 Director, Delhi Gymkhana Club (2006–08)
 Member, Central Council of Institute of Chartered Accountants of India (1994–97)

Awards and honours 
 Wins Social Entrepreneur Award  
 Wins the Excellence in Social Entrepreneurship Award instituted by NHRDN & NDIM - People Excellence Awards 2021
 Conferred Distinguished Alumni Award, Shri Ram College of Commerce, University of Delhi by the (late) Honorable Finance Minister of India, Shri Arun Jaitley (2019)
 Featured at "Number One Spot" in Delhi City Rankings for the Owler Award. Shortlisted among Top 10 global leaders (from over 500) in the Consulting and Business Services Segment(2017)
 Awarded CA Business Leader - CA Global Achiever Award by Institute of Chartered Accountants of India (2015)
 Conferred Global Punjabi Society Achievers Award by Dr. Manmohan Singh, former Prime Minister of India (2015)
 Awarded Presidents Gold Medal for securing All India first position in Company Secretary Final Examination (1986)
 Awarded Hora Medal, Shri Ram College of Commerce, University of Delhi, for outstanding student in extra-curricular activities (1983)
 Awarded Rudra Prize for best all-rounder student at Modern School (1980)

References

Living people
1961 births
Businesspeople from Delhi
Modern School (New Delhi) alumni